Pobiednik can refer to two villages in close proximity to each other in the administrative district of Gmina Igołomia-Wawrzeńczyce, Kraków County, Lesser Poland Voivodeship, southern Poland:

Pobiednik Wielki
Pobiednik Mały